Sanatana Dharma College Ground is an A-class cricket stadium built by Kerala Cricket Association located at Sanatana Dharma College in the city of Alappuzha, Kerala. The stadium was inaugurated on 6 June 2015.

Infrastructure
The ground has five turf wickets. 75 yards is the distance from wicket to either side of the ground. Stadium consist of player's pavilion, a complex for women players and an indoor facility. Outside the ground there are three turf wickets, an astro turf wicket and four concrete wickets for practice. A gymnasium and a shuttle badminton court have also been set up.

Project Details
Kerala Cricket Association spent a sum of Rs. 3.5 crore for the construction of a modern ground. The college ground had been handed over free of cost to the Kerala Cricket Association. The association will retain possession for a period of 15 years as per a memorandum of understanding (MoU) signed between the Kerala Cricket Association and the college management.

See also
Alappuzha
Sports in Kerala
Kerala Cricket Association
Sanatana Dharma College

References

Cricket grounds in Kerala
Buildings and structures in Alappuzha district
Sports venues completed in 2015
2015 establishments in Kerala